The 2015 South Alabama Jaguars football team represented the University of South Alabama in the 2015 NCAA Division I FBS football season. They were led by seventh-year head coach Joey Jones and played their home games at Ladd–Peebles Stadium in Mobile, Alabama. The Jaguars, members of the Sun Belt Conference finished the season 5–7, 3–5 in Sun Belt play finishing in a five way tie for fifth place.

Schedule
South Alabama announced their 2015 football schedule on February 27, 2015. The 2015 schedule consist of six home and away games in the regular season. The Jaguars will host Sun Belt foes Appalachian State, Arkansas State, Idaho, and Louisiana–Lafayette, and will travel to Georgia Southern, Georgia State, Texas State, and Troy.

Game summaries

Gardner–Webb

at Nebraska

at San Diego State

NC State

at Troy

Arkansas State

at Texas State

Idaho

Louisiana–Lafayette

at Georgia State

at Georgia Southern

Appalachian State

References

South Alabama
South Alabama Jaguars football seasons
South Alabama Jaguars football